Cotteroceras is a genus of proterocameroceratids from the Lower Ordovician of North America and Siberia  characterized by a long straight and compressed shell with very short camerae and long body chamber. Sutures are straight and oblique, sloping dorsoventrally toward the apex. The siphuncle is large but details are unknown.

References

 Teichert, C, 1964. Proterocameroceratidae, pp 166– 170 in the Treatise on Invertebrate Paleontology Part K. Geol Soc of America and Univ of Kansas Press.

Prehistoric nautiloid genera
Ordovician cephalopods
Ordovician cephalopods of North America
Fossil taxa described in 1936